David Kreuger is a Swedish songwriter and music producer.

Career 
David Kreuger began at Cheiron Studios in the spring of 1993. During the period 1993-1997, he worked with Per Magnusson on several projects. Together, they produced and wrote songs for Swedish artists such as E-Type and Leila K, but also for international groups such as Solid Harmonie and Lyte Funkie Ones. Kreuger, Magnusson, and Jörgen Elofsson worked with Boyzone on their album Where We Belong in 1997, and Britney Spears's debut studio album in 1999.

He also co-produced Leah Haywood's debut single We Think It's Love, which was a top ten single in Australia. Kreuger also co-wrote the second #1 hit, "If I Let You Go", by Westlife.

Eurovision Song Contest national finals entries
Melodifestivalen entries (Sweden)

Krajowe Eliminacje entries (Poland)

External links
 Official A Side Productions website

Year of birth missing (living people)
Living people
Swedish songwriters